The Enchanting Enemy (Italian: L'incantevole nemica) is a 1953 Italian comedy film directed by Claudio Gora and starring Silvana Pampanini, Robert Lamoureux and Carlo Campanini.

The film's sets were designed by the art directors Alberto Boccianti and Oscar D'Amico.

Plot
A wealthy industrialist cheese manufacturer has a paranoid fear of communists and comes to believe that one of his employees is the head of a cell of agents. To keep an eye on him he invites him into his life, even to the extent that he becomes engaged to his attractive daughter.

Cast 
 Silvana Pampanini as Silvia
 Robert Lamoureux as Roberto
 Carlo Campanini as Albertini
 Ugo Tognazzi as Direttore della fabbrica 
 Pina Renzi as Signora Albertini 
 Mita Dover
 Giuseppe Porelli
 Nando Bruno 
 Renato Chiantoni
 Nerio Bernardi
 Gianni Agus
 Mario Siletti
 Buster Keaton
 Quartetto Cetra
 Annette Poivre
 Raymond Bussières

References

Bibliography
 Gundle, Stephen. Fame Amid the Ruins: Italian Film Stardom in the Age of Neorealism. Berghahn Books, 2019.

External links

1953 films
Films directed by Claudio Gora
Italian comedy films
1953 comedy films
1950s Italian-language films
French comedy films
Italian black-and-white films
1950s Italian films
1950s French films